Tom Forster is an American gymnastics coach, entrepreneur, and former gymnast. After Valeri Liukin resigned from the role in February 2018,  USA Gymnastics named Forster as the high performance team coordinator for the United States women's national gymnastics team in July 2018 but he later resigned in December 2021. Prior to his position at USA Gymnastics, he found acclaim as a gymnastics coach on the national elite gymnastics circuit after founding and opening the Colorado Aerials Gymnastics facility in Colorado Springs, Colorado in 1983— a club that has spawned many U.S. National team members and two Olympic Trials competitors. After widespread criticism from gymnastics fans, he stepped down on December 9th, 2021.

Personal life 
Forster graduated from Mitchell High School in Colorado Springs, and later Pennsylvania State University where he was a member of the Penn State Nittany Lions men's gymnastics team.

He is married to Lori Forster, with whom he founded Colorado Aerials in 1983. The facility is run by his family.

References 

Living people
American male artistic gymnasts
Sportspeople from Colorado Springs, Colorado
Pennsylvania State University alumni
Year of birth missing (living people)